Rosiridin is a chemical compound that has been isolated from Rhodiola sachalinensis. Rosiridin can inhibit monoamine oxidases A and B, possibly meaning that the compound could help in the treatment of depression and senile dementia.

References

Crassulaceae
Terpenoid glycosides